Cowin Auto (official name Yibin Kaiyi (Cowin) Automobile Co., Ltd., Chinese: 凯 翼, Kǎiyì) is a Chinese car manufacturer founded in 2014.

History
The origin of the Cowin denomination dates back to 2003 when it was introduced to identify the homonymous car model which was nothing more than the restyling of the old Chery Fulwin (the licensed version of the first series of Seat Toledo as well as the first car produced by the same Chinese); subsequently, from 2009, Chery decided to reorganize its product range using this name to identify a sub-range of models that are now old and at the end of the production cycle but kept in the price list only because they still guaranteed decent sales volumes; thus were born the Chery Cowin 1 (the restyling of the old QQ6), the Chery Cowin 2 (ex Chery Cowin / Fulwin), Chery Cowin 3 (ex model Chery A5), etc.  

Cowin Auto was established as a subsidiary of the Chinese automaker Chery Automobile in 2014 with the aim of developing a new niche in the dynamically developing car market in China. Cowin was targeted at young buyers from medium-sized and small towns in an Asian country, wanting to encourage them to buy mainly through a low price.

The first vehicle of the Cowin brand was the subcompact car C3 sedan and C3R hatchback, which went on sales in November 2014 - six months after its debut. In the following years, Cowin's lineup was expanded mainly in terms of SUVs and crossovers starting with the X3 in 2016. Then a year later, it was joined by the larger X5. In 2020, Cowin launched a more powerful car in the form of the E5, while at the same time, in order to stop the decline in popularity of the brand, the Showjet was launched.

Sale of shares to the city of Yibin
In 2018, following a restructuring of the Chery shareholding, part of Cowin was sold to the city of Yibin through the subsidiaries Yibin Auto Industry Development Investment Co., Ltd. and Sichuan Yibin Pushi (PUSH) Group Co., Ltd. which took possession of 50.5% and 0.5% respectively. Chery Automobile retained a 49% stake.

Yibin City paid a total of RMB 2.5 billion for a 51% stake in Cowin (valuing the company at around RMB 5 billion, about $ 800 million). Cowin Auto's headquarters moved to Yibin, Sichuan and the company changed its official name to Yibin Kaiyi (Cowin) Automobile Co., Ltd. 

On 7 January 2019 the new production plant in Yibin was inaugurated and the X5 goes into production. Production at the Chery plant in Wuhu will continue for the X3 model.

Vehicles
Cowin C3
Cowin E3
Cowin E5
Cowin X3
Cowin X5
Cowin V3
Cowin V7
Cowin Showjet
Cowin Xuandu
Cowin Kunlun

References

External links 
 

Chery
Vehicle manufacturing companies established in 2014
Car manufacturers of China
Electric vehicle manufacturers of China
Chinese companies established in 2014
Chinese brands